William Hogan may refer to:
William Hogan (author) (born 1937), American novelist
William Hogan (Canadian politician) (born 1937), member of the Newfoundland House of Assembly
William Hogan (footballer) (born 1871), English footballer
William Hogan (New York politician) (1792–1874), United States Representative from New York
William Hogan (priest), excommunicated Roman Catholic priest and author
Bill Hogan III (ice hockey), American ice hockey player

See also
Bill Hogan, member of the New Brunswick Legislative Assembly